Janet Abbate (born June 3, 1962) is an associate professor of science, technology, and society at Virginia Tech. Her research focuses on the history of computer science and the Internet, particularly on the participation of women in the field.

Academic career
Abbate received her bachelor's degree from Radcliffe College and her master's degree from the University of Pennsylvania. She also received her Ph.D. from the in American Civilization from the University of Pennsylvania in 1994. From 1996 to 1998, she was a postdoctoral fellow with the IEEE History Center, where she conducted research on women in computing. She joined the faculty of Virginia Tech's Northern Capital Region campus in 2004 and is now an associate professor and the co-director of the graduate program in Science, Technology, and Society.

Prior to her academic work, Abbate was a computer programmer herself. Her background in computer programming has influenced her research approach and has been cited as relevant in reviews of her work.

Research
In 1995, Abbate co-edited Standards Policy for Information Infrastructure with Brian Kahin.

Abbate is the author of two books: Inventing the Internet (2000) and Recoding Gender: Women’s Changing Participation in Computing (2012). Inventing the Internet was widely reviewed as an important work in the history of computing and networking, particularly in highlighting the role of social dynamics and of non-American participation in early networking development. The book was also praised for its use of archival resources to tell the history. Though some have criticized the work, citing Abbate's computer programming background as causing issues in presenting a non-technical narrative. She has since written about the need for historians to be aware of the perspectives they take in writing about the history of the Internet and explored the implications of defining the Internet in terms of "technology, use and local experience" rather than through the lens of the spread of technologies from the United States.

Recoding Gender also received positive reviews, especially for its incorporation of interviews with women in the field and for providing a historical overview of how women and gender have shaped computer programming. However, the book has also been criticized for being disjointed—that the link of "women in computing" is not strong enough to hold the different chapters together. The book received the 2014 Computer History Museum prize.

See also 

 History of the Internet
 Protocol Wars

References

1962 births
Living people
Virginia Tech faculty
Science and technology studies scholars
University of Pennsylvania School of Arts and Sciences alumni

Radcliffe College alumni
American women academics
21st-century American women educators
21st-century American educators